Heisuke (written: ,  or ) is a masculine Japanese given name. Notable people with the name include:

, Japanese general
, Japanese mathematician
, Japanese samurai
, Japanese general

Japanese masculine given names